Lee & Helen George House is a historic home located at Hickory, Catawba County, North Carolina.  It was built in 1951, and is a one-story, Redwood weatherboard sheathed Modernist / Usonian-style dwelling. The house consists of a center main block with projecting rooms on each end of the façade, a rear wing, and an attached carport.

It was listed on the National Register of Historic Places in 2012.

References

Houses on the National Register of Historic Places in North Carolina
Houses completed in 1951
Modernist architecture in North Carolina
Houses in Catawba County, North Carolina
National Register of Historic Places in Catawba County, North Carolina